Nuclear fuel is material used in nuclear power stations to produce heat to power turbines. Heat is created when nuclear fuel undergoes nuclear fission.

Most nuclear fuels contain heavy fissile actinide elements that are capable of undergoing and sustaining nuclear fission. The three most relevant fissile isotopes are uranium-233, uranium-235 and plutonium-239. When the unstable nuclei of these atoms are hit by a slow-moving neutron, they frequently split, creating two daughter nuclei and two or three more neutrons. In that case, the neutrons released go on to split more nuclei. This creates a self-sustaining chain reaction that is controlled in a nuclear reactor, or uncontrolled in a nuclear weapon. Alternatively, if the nucleus absorbs the neutron without splitting, it creates a heavier nucleus with one additional neutron.

The processes involved in mining, refining, purifying, using, and disposing of nuclear fuel are collectively known as the nuclear fuel cycle.

Not all types of nuclear fuels create power from nuclear fission; plutonium-238 and some other isotopes are used to produce small amounts of nuclear power by radioactive decay in radioisotope thermoelectric generators and other types of atomic batteries.

Nuclear fuel has the highest energy density of all practical fuel sources.

Oxide fuel

For fission reactors, the fuel (typically based on uranium) is usually based on the metal oxide; the oxides are used rather than the metals themselves because the oxide melting point is much higher than that of the metal and because it cannot burn, being already in the oxidized state.

Uranium dioxide 
Uranium dioxide is a black semiconducting solid. It can be made by heating uranyl nitrate to form .

This is then converted by heating with hydrogen to form UO2. It can be made from enriched uranium hexafluoride by reacting with ammonia to form a solid called ammonium diuranate, . This is then heated (calcined) to form  and U3O8 which is then converted by heating with hydrogen or ammonia to form UO2.

The UO2 is mixed with an organic binder and pressed into pellets, these pellets are then fired at a much higher temperature (in H2/Ar) to sinter the solid. The aim is to form a dense solid which has few pores.

The thermal conductivity of uranium dioxide is very low compared with that of zirconium metal, and it goes down as the temperature goes up.

Corrosion of uranium dioxide in water is controlled by similar electrochemical processes to the galvanic corrosion of a metal surface.

As the  accumulates the chain reaction shifts from pure  at initiation of the fuel use to a ratio of about 70%  and 30%  at the end of the 18 to 24 month fuel exposure period.

MOX

Mixed oxide, or MOX fuel, is a blend of plutonium and natural or depleted uranium which behaves similarly (though not identically) to the enriched uranium feed for which most nuclear reactors were designed. MOX fuel is an alternative to low enriched uranium (LEU) fuel used in the light water reactors which predominate nuclear power generation.

Some concern has been expressed that used MOX cores will introduce new disposal challenges, though MOX is itself a means to dispose of surplus plutonium by transmutation.

Reprocessing of commercial nuclear fuel to make MOX was done in the Sellafield MOX Plant (England). As of 2015, MOX fuel is made in France (see Marcoule Nuclear Site), and to a lesser extent in Russia (see Mining and Chemical Combine), India and Japan. China plans to develop fast breeder reactors (see CEFR) and reprocessing.

The Global Nuclear Energy Partnership, was a U.S. proposal in the George W. Bush Administration to form an international partnership to see spent nuclear fuel reprocessed in a way that renders the plutonium in it usable for nuclear fuel but not for nuclear weapons. Reprocessing of spent commercial-reactor nuclear fuel has not been permitted in the United States due to nonproliferation considerations. All of the other reprocessing nations have long had nuclear weapons from military-focused "research"-reactor fuels except for Japan. It behaves like  and its fission releases a similar amount of energy. The higher the burn-up, the more plutonium in the spent fuel, but the lower the fraction of fissile plutonium. Typically about one percent of the used fuel discharged from a reactor is plutonium, and some two thirds of this is fissile (c. 50% , 15% ). Worldwide, some 70 tonnes of plutonium contained in used fuel is removed when refueling reactors each year.

Metal fuel
Metal fuels have the advantage of a much higher heat conductivity than oxide fuels but cannot survive equally high temperatures. Metal fuels have a long history of use, stretching from the Clementine reactor in 1946 to many test and research reactors. Metal fuels have the potential for the highest fissile atom density. Metal fuels are normally alloyed, but some metal fuels have been made with pure uranium metal. Uranium alloys that have been used include uranium aluminum, uranium zirconium, uranium silicon, uranium molybdenum, and uranium zirconium hydride (UZrH). Any of the aforementioned fuels can be made with plutonium and other actinides as part of a closed nuclear fuel cycle. Metal fuels have been used in water reactors and liquid metal fast breeder reactors, such as EBR-II.

TRIGA fuel
TRIGA fuel is used in TRIGA (Training, Research, Isotopes, General Atomics) reactors.
The TRIGA reactor uses UZrH fuel, which has a prompt negative fuel temperature coefficient of reactivity, meaning that as the temperature of the core increases, the reactivity decreases—so it is highly unlikely for a meltdown to occur. Most cores that use this fuel are "high leakage" cores where the excess leaked neutrons can be utilized for research. That is, they can be used as a neutron source. TRIGA fuel was originally designed to use highly enriched uranium, however in 1978 the U.S. Department of Energy launched its Reduced Enrichment for Research Test Reactors program, which promoted reactor conversion to low-enriched uranium fuel. A total of 35 TRIGA reactors have been installed at locations across the US. A further 35 reactors have been installed in other countries.

Actinide fuel
In a fast neutron reactor, the minor actinides produced by neutron capture of uranium and plutonium can be used as fuel. Metal actinide fuel is typically an alloy of zirconium, uranium, plutonium, and minor actinides. It can be made inherently safe as thermal expansion of the metal alloy will increase neutron leakage.

Molten plutonium
Molten plutonium, alloyed with other metals to lower its melting point and encapsulated in tantalum, was tested in two experimental reactors, LAMPRE I and LAMPRE II, at Los Alamos National Laboratory in the 1960s. "LAMPRE experienced three separate fuel failures during operation."

Non-oxide ceramic fuels
Ceramic fuels other than oxides have the advantage of high heat conductivities and melting points, but they are more prone to swelling than oxide fuels and are not understood as well.

Uranium nitride

This is often the fuel of choice for reactor designs that NASA produces, one advantage is that UN has a better thermal conductivity than UO2. Uranium nitride has a very high melting point. This fuel has the disadvantage that unless 15N was used (in place of the more common 14N) that a large amount of 14C would be generated from the nitrogen by the (n,p) reaction. As the nitrogen required for such a fuel would be so expensive it is likely that the fuel would have to be reprocessed by pyroprocessing to enable the 15N to be recovered. It is likely that if the fuel was processed and dissolved in nitric acid that the nitrogen enriched with 15N would be diluted with the common 14N. Fluoride volatility is a method of reprocessing that does not rely on nitric acid, but it has only been demonstrated in relatively small scale installations whereas the established PUREX process is used commercially for about a third of all spent nuclear fuel (the rest being largely subject to a "once through fuel cycle"). All nitrogen-fluoride compounds are volatile or gaseous at room temperature and could be fractionally distilled from the other gaseous products (including recovered uranium hexafluoride) to recover the initially used nitrogen. If the fuel could be processed in such a way as to ensure low contamination with non-radioactive carbon (not a common fission product and absent in nuclear reactors that don't use it as a moderator) then Fluoride volatility could be used to separate the  produced by producing carbon tetrafluoride.  is proposed for use in particularly long lived low power nuclear batteries called diamond battery.

Uranium carbide

Much of what is known about uranium carbide is in the form of pin-type fuel elements for liquid metal fast reactors during their intense study during the 1960s and 1970s. However, recently there has been a revived interest in uranium carbide in the form of plate fuel and most notably, micro fuel particles (such as TRISO particles).

The high thermal conductivity and high melting point makes uranium carbide an attractive fuel. In addition, because of the absence of oxygen in this fuel (during the course of irradiation, excess gas pressure can build from the formation of O2 or other gases) as well as the ability to complement a ceramic coating (a ceramic-ceramic interface has structural and chemical advantages), uranium carbide could be the ideal fuel candidate for certain Generation IV reactors such as the gas-cooled fast reactor. While the neutron cross section of carbon is low, during years of burnup, the predominantly  will undergo neutron capture to produce stable  as well as radioactive . Unlike the  produced by using Uranium nitrate, the  will make up only a small isotopic impurity in the overall carbon content and thus make the entirety of the carbon content unsuitable for non-nuclear uses but the  concentration will be too low for use in nuclear batteries without enrichment. Nuclear graphite discharged from reactors where it was used as a moderator presents the same issue.

Liquid fuels
Liquid fuels are liquids containing dissolved nuclear fuel and have been shown to offer numerous operational advantages compared to traditional solid fuel approaches.

Liquid-fuel reactors offer significant safety advantages due to their inherently stable "self-adjusting" reactor dynamics. This provides two major benefits: virtually eliminating the possibility of a runaway reactor meltdown, and providing an automatic load-following capability which is well suited to electricity generation and high-temperature industrial heat applications.

Another major advantage of some liquid core designs is their ability to be drained rapidly into a passively safe dump-tank. This advantage was conclusively demonstrated repeatedly as part of a weekly shutdown procedure during the highly successful 4 year Molten Salt Reactor Experiment.

In contrast, molten salt reactors (MSR) are capable of retaining the fuel mixture for significantly extended periods, which not only increases fuel efficiency dramatically but also incinerates the vast majority of its own waste as part of the normal operational characteristics. A downside to letting the  escape instead of allowing it to capture neutrons converting it to the basically stable and chemically inert , is that it will quickly decay to the highly chemically reactive long lived radioactive , which behaves similar to other alkali metals and can be taken up by organisms in their metabolism.

Molten salts
Molten salt fuels are mixtures of actinide salts (e.g. thorium/uranium fluoride/chloride) with other salts, used in liquid form above their typical melting points of several hundred degrees C. In some molten salt-fueled reactor designs, such as the liquid fluoride thorium reactor (LFTR), this fuel salt is also the coolant; in other designs, such as the stable salt reactor, the fuel salt is contained in fuel pins and the coolant is a separate, non-radioactive salt. There is a further category of molten salt-cooled reactors in which the fuel is not in molten salt form, but a molten salt is used for cooling.

Molten salt fuels were used in the LFTR known as the Molten Salt Reactor Experiment, as well as other liquid core reactor experiments. The liquid fuel for the molten salt reactor was a mixture of lithium, beryllium, thorium and uranium fluorides: LiF-BeF2-ThF4-UF4 (72-16-12-0.4 mol%). It had a peak operating temperature of 705 °C in the experiment, but could have operated at much higher temperatures since the boiling point of the molten salt was in excess of 1400 °C.

Aqueous solutions of uranyl salts
The aqueous homogeneous reactors (AHRs) use a solution of uranyl sulfate or other uranium salt in water. Historically, AHRs have all been small research reactors, not large power reactors. An AHR known as the Medical Isotope Production System is being considered for production of medical isotopes.

Liquid metals or alloys
The Dual fluid reactor has a variant DFR/m which works with eutectic liquid metal alloys, e.g. U-Cr or U-Fe.

Common physical forms of nuclear fuel

Uranium dioxide (UO2) powder is compacted to cylindrical pellets and sintered at high temperatures to produce ceramic nuclear fuel pellets with a high density and well defined physical properties and chemical composition. A grinding process is used to achieve a uniform cylindrical geometry with narrow tolerances. Such fuel pellets are then stacked and filled into the metallic tubes. The metal used for the tubes depends on the design of the reactor. Stainless steel was used in the past, but most reactors now use a zirconium alloy which, in addition to being highly corrosion-resistant, has low neutron absorption. The tubes containing the fuel pellets are sealed: these tubes are called fuel rods. The finished fuel rods are grouped into fuel assemblies that are used to build up the core of a power reactor.

Cladding is the outer layer of the fuel rods, standing between the coolant and the nuclear fuel. It is made of a corrosion-resistant material with low absorption cross section for thermal neutrons, usually Zircaloy or steel in modern constructions, or magnesium with small amount of aluminium and other metals for the now-obsolete Magnox reactors. Cladding prevents radioactive fission fragments from escaping the fuel into the coolant and contaminating it. Besides the prevention of radioactive leaks this also serves to keep the coolant as non-corrosive as feasible and to prevent reactions between chemically aggressive fission products and the coolant. For example, the highly reactive alkali metal caesium which reacts strongly with water, producing hydrogen, and which is among the more common fission products.

PWR fuel
Pressurized water reactor (PWR) fuel consists of cylindrical rods put into bundles. A uranium oxide ceramic is formed into pellets and inserted into Zircaloy tubes that are bundled together. There are about 179–264 fuel rods per fuel bundle and about 121 to 193 fuel bundles are loaded into a reactor core. Generally, the fuel bundles consist of fuel rods bundled 14×14 to 17×17. In PWR fuel bundles, control rods are inserted through the top directly into the fuel bundle. The fuel bundles usually are enriched several percent in 235U. The uranium oxide is dried before inserting into the tubes to try to eliminate moisture in the ceramic fuel that can lead to corrosion and hydrogen embrittlement. The Zircaloy tubes are pressurized with helium to try to minimize pellet-cladding interaction which can lead to fuel rod failure over long periods.

BWR fuel
In boiling water reactors (BWR), the fuel is similar to PWR fuel except that the bundles are "canned". That is, there is a thin tube surrounding each bundle. This is primarily done to prevent local density variations from affecting neutronics and thermal hydraulics of the reactor core. In modern BWR fuel bundles, there are either 91, 92, or 96 fuel rods per assembly depending on the manufacturer. A range between 368 assemblies for the smallest and 800 assemblies for the largest BWR in the U.S.  form the reactor core.

CANDU fuel
They consist of sintered (UO2) pellets in zirconium alloy tubes, welded to zirconium alloy end plates. Modern types typically have 37 identical fuel pins radially arranged about the long axis of the bundle, but in the past several different configurations and numbers of pins have been used. The CANFLEX bundle has 43 fuel elements, with two element sizes. It is also about 10 cm (4 inches) in diameter, 0.5 m (20 in) long and weighs about 20 kg (44 lb) and replaces the 37-pin standard bundle. It has been designed specifically to increase fuel performance by utilizing two different pin diameters. Current CANDU designs do not need enriched uranium to achieve criticality (due to the lower neutron absorption in their heavy water moderator compared to light water), however, some newer concepts call for low enrichment to help reduce the size of the reactors. The Atucha nuclear power plant in Argentina, a similar design to the CANDU but built by German KWU was originally designed for non-enriched fuel but since switched to slightly enriched fuel with a  content about 0.1 percentage points higher than in natural uranium.

Less-common fuel forms
Various other nuclear fuel forms find use in specific applications, but lack the widespread use of those found in BWRs, PWRs, and CANDU power plants. Many of these fuel forms are only found in research reactors, or have military applications.

Magnox fuel

Magnox (magnesium non-oxidising) reactors are pressurised, carbon dioxide–cooled, graphite-moderated reactors using natural uranium (i.e. unenriched) as fuel and Magnox alloy as fuel cladding. Magnox alloy consists mainly of magnesium with small amounts of aluminium and other metals—used in cladding unenriched uranium metal fuel with a non-oxidising covering to contain fission products. This material has the advantage of a low neutron capture cross-section, but has two major disadvantages:

 It limits the maximum temperature, and hence the thermal efficiency, of the plant.
 It reacts with water, preventing long-term storage of spent fuel under water - such as in a spent fuel pool.

Magnox fuel incorporated cooling fins to provide maximum heat transfer despite low operating temperatures, making it expensive to produce. While the use of uranium metal rather than oxide made nuclear reprocessing more straightforward and therefore cheaper, the need to reprocess fuel a short time after removal from the reactor meant that the fission product hazard was severe. Expensive remote handling facilities were required to address this issue.

TRISO fuel

Tristructural-isotropic (TRISO) fuel is a type of micro-particle fuel. A particle consists of a kernel of UOX fuel (sometimes UC or UCO), which has been coated with four layers of three isotropic materials deposited through fluidized chemical vapor deposition (FCVD). The four layers are a porous buffer layer made of carbon that absorbs fission product recoils, followed by a dense inner layer of protective pyrolytic carbon (PyC), followed by a ceramic layer of SiC to retain fission products at elevated temperatures and to give the TRISO particle more structural integrity, followed by a dense outer layer of PyC. TRISO particles are then encapsulated into cylindrical or spherical graphite pellets. TRISO fuel particles are designed not to crack due to the stresses from processes (such as differential thermal expansion or fission gas pressure) at temperatures up to 1600 °C, and therefore can contain the fuel in the worst of accident scenarios in a properly designed reactor. Two such reactor designs are the prismatic-block gas-cooled reactor (such as the GT-MHR) and the pebble-bed reactor (PBR). Both of these reactor designs are high temperature gas reactors (HTGRs). These are also the basic reactor designs of very-high-temperature reactors (VHTRs), one of the six classes of reactor designs in the Generation IV initiative that is attempting to reach even higher HTGR outlet temperatures.

TRISO fuel particles were originally developed in the United Kingdom as part of the Dragon reactor project. The inclusion of the SiC as diffusion barrier was first suggested by D. T. Livey. The first nuclear reactor to use TRISO fuels was the Dragon reactor and the first powerplant was the THTR-300. Currently, TRISO fuel compacts are being used in some experimental reactors, such as the HTR-10 in China and the High-temperature engineering test reactor in Japan. Spherical fuel elements utilizing a TRISO particle with a UO2 and UC solid solution kernel are being used in the Xe-100 in the United States.

QUADRISO fuel

In QUADRISO particles a burnable neutron poison (europium oxide or erbium oxide or carbide) layer surrounds the fuel kernel of ordinary TRISO particles to better manage the excess of reactivity. If the core is equipped both with TRISO and QUADRISO fuels, at beginning of life neutrons do not reach the fuel of the QUADRISO particles because they are stopped by the burnable poison. During reactor operation, neutron irradiation of the poison causes it to "burn up" or progressively transmute to non-poison isotopes, depleting this poison effect and leaving progressively more neutrons available for sustaining the chain-reaction. This mechanism compensates for the accumulation of undesirable neutron poisons which are an unavoidable part of the fission products, as well as normal fissile fuel "burn up" or depletion. In the generalized QUADRISO fuel concept the poison can eventually be mixed with the fuel kernel or the outer pyrocarbon. The QUADRISO concept was conceived at Argonne National Laboratory.

RBMK fuel
RBMK reactor fuel was used in Soviet-designed and built RBMK-type reactors. This is a low-enriched uranium oxide fuel. The fuel elements in an RBMK are 3 m long each, and two of these sit back-to-back on each fuel channel, pressure tube. Reprocessed uranium from Russian VVER reactor spent fuel is used to fabricate RBMK fuel. Following the Chernobyl accident, the enrichment of fuel was changed from 2.0% to 2.4%, to compensate for control rod modifications and the introduction of additional absorbers.

CerMet fuel
CerMet fuel consists of ceramic fuel particles (usually uranium oxide) embedded in a metal matrix. It is hypothesized that this type of fuel is what is used in United States Navy reactors. This fuel has high heat transport characteristics and can withstand a large amount of expansion.

Plate-type fuel

Plate-type fuel has fallen out of favor over the years. Plate-type fuel is commonly composed of enriched uranium sandwiched between metal cladding. Plate-type fuel is used in several research reactors where a high neutron flux is desired, for uses such as material irradiation studies or isotope production, without the high temperatures seen in ceramic, cylindrical fuel. It is currently used in the Advanced Test Reactor (ATR) at Idaho National Laboratory, and the nuclear research reactor at the University of Massachusetts Lowell Radiation Laboratory.

Sodium-bonded fuel
Sodium-bonded fuel consists of fuel that has liquid sodium in the gap between the fuel slug (or pellet) and the cladding. This fuel type is often used for sodium-cooled liquid metal fast reactors. It has been used in EBR-I, EBR-II, and the FFTF. The fuel slug may be metallic or ceramic. The sodium bonding is used to reduce the temperature of the fuel.

Accident tolerant fuels 
Accident tolerant fuels (ATF) are a series of new nuclear fuel concepts, researched in order to improve fuel performance under accident conditions, such as loss-of-coolant accident (LOCA) or reaction-initiated accidents (RIA). These concerns became more prominent after the Fukushima Daiichi nuclear disaster in Japan, in particular regarding light-water reactor (LWR) fuels performance under accident conditions.

The aim of the research is to develop nuclear fuels that can tolerate loss of active cooling for a considerably longer period than the existing fuel designs and prevent or delay the release of radionuclides during an accident. This research is focused on reconsidering the design of fuel pellets and cladding, as well as the interactions between the two.

Spent nuclear fuel

Used nuclear fuel is a complex mixture of the fission products, uranium, plutonium, and the transplutonium metals. In fuel which has been used at high temperature in power reactors it is common for the fuel to be heterogeneous; often the fuel will contain nanoparticles of platinum group metals such as palladium. Also the fuel may well have cracked, swollen, and been heated close to its melting point. Despite the fact that the used fuel can be cracked, it is very insoluble in water, and is able to retain the vast majority of the actinides and fission products within the uranium dioxide crystal lattice.  The radiation hazard from spent nuclear fuel declines as its radioactive components decay, but remains high for many years.  For example 10 years after removal from a reactor, the surface dose rate for a typical spent fuel assembly still exceeds 10,000 rem/hour, resulting in a fatal dose in just minutes.

Oxide fuel under accident conditions

Two main modes of release exist, the fission products can be vaporised or small particles of the fuel can be dispersed.

Fuel behavior and post-irradiation examination

Post-Irradiation Examination (PIE) is the study of used nuclear materials such as nuclear fuel. It has several purposes. It is known that by examination of used fuel that the failure modes which occur during normal use (and the manner in which the fuel will behave during an accident) can be studied. In addition information is gained which enables the users of fuel to assure themselves of its quality and it also assists in the development of new fuels. After major accidents the core (or what is left of it) is normally subject to PIE to find out what happened. One site where PIE is done is the ITU which is the EU centre for the study of highly radioactive materials.

Materials in a high-radiation environment (such as a reactor) can undergo unique behaviors such as swelling and non-thermal creep. If there are nuclear reactions within the material (such as what happens in the fuel), the stoichiometry will also change slowly over time. These behaviors can lead to new material properties, cracking, and fission gas release.

The thermal conductivity of uranium dioxide is low; it is affected by porosity and burn-up. The burn-up results in fission products being dissolved in the lattice (such as lanthanides), the precipitation of fission products such as palladium, the formation of fission gas bubbles due to fission products such as xenon and krypton and radiation damage of the lattice. The low thermal conductivity can lead to overheating of the center part of the pellets during use. The porosity results in a decrease in both the thermal conductivity of the fuel and the swelling which occurs during use.

According to the International Nuclear Safety Center the thermal conductivity of uranium dioxide can be predicted under different conditions by a series of equations.

The bulk density of the fuel can be related to the thermal conductivity

Where ρ is the bulk density of the fuel and ρtd is the theoretical density of the uranium dioxide.

Then the thermal conductivity of the porous phase (Kf) is related to the conductivity of the perfect phase (Ko, no porosity) by the following equation. Note that s is a term for the shape factor of the holes.

Kf = Ko(1 − p/1 + (s − 1)p)

Rather than measuring the thermal conductivity using the traditional methods such as Lees' disk, the Forbes' method, or Searle's bar, it is common to use Laser Flash Analysis where a small disc of fuel is placed in a furnace. After being heated to the required temperature one side of the disc is illuminated with a laser pulse, the time required for the heat wave to flow through the disc, the density of the disc, and the thickness of the disk can then be used to calculate and determine the thermal conductivity.

λ = ρCpα

λ thermal conductivity
ρ density
Cp heat capacity
α thermal diffusivity

If t1/2 is defined as the time required for the non illuminated surface to experience half its final temperature rise then.

α = 0.1388 L2/t1/2

L is the thickness of the disc

For details see K. Shinzato and T. Baba (2001).

Radioisotope decay fuels

Radioisotope battery

An atomic battery (also called a nuclear battery or radioisotope battery) is a device which uses the radioactive decay to generate electricity. These systems use radioisotopes that produce low energy beta particles or sometimes alpha particles of varying energies. Low energy beta particles are needed to prevent the production of high energy penetrating bremsstrahlung radiation that would require heavy shielding. Radioisotopes such as plutonium-238, curium-242, curium-244 and strontium-90 have been used. Tritium, nickel-63, promethium-147, and technetium-99 have been tested.

There are two main categories of atomic batteries: thermal and non-thermal. The non-thermal atomic batteries, which have many different designs, exploit charged alpha and beta particles. These designs include the direct charging generators, betavoltaics, the optoelectric nuclear battery, and the radioisotope piezoelectric generator. The thermal atomic batteries on the other hand, convert the heat from the radioactive decay to electricity. These designs include thermionic converter, thermophotovoltaic cells, alkali-metal thermal to electric converter, and the most common design, the radioisotope thermoelectric generator.

Radioisotope thermoelectric generator

A radioisotope thermoelectric generator (RTG) is a simple electrical generator which converts heat into electricity from a radioisotope using an array of thermocouples.

 has become the most widely used fuel for RTGs, in the form of plutonium dioxide. It has a half-life of 87.7 years, reasonable energy density, and exceptionally low gamma and neutron radiation levels. Some Russian terrestrial RTGs have used ; this isotope has a shorter half-life and a much lower energy density, but is cheaper. Early RTGs, first built in 1958 by the U.S. Atomic Energy Commission, have used . This fuel provides phenomenally huge energy density, (a single gram of polonium-210 generates 140 watts thermal) but has limited use because of its very short half-life and gamma production, and has been phased out of use for this application.

Radioisotope heater unit (RHU)

A radioisotope heater unit (RHU) typically provides about 1 watt of heat each, derived from the decay of a few grams of plutonium-238. This heat is given off continuously for several decades.

Their function is to provide highly localised heating of sensitive equipment (such as electronics in outer space). The Cassini–Huygens orbiter to Saturn contains 82 of these units (in addition to its 3 main RTGs for power generation). The Huygens probe to Titan contains 35 devices.

Fusion fuels

Fusion fuels are fuels to use in hypothetical Fusion power reactors. They include deuterium (2H) and tritium (3H) as well as helium-3 (3He). Many other elements can be fused together, but the larger electrical charge of their nuclei means that much higher temperatures are required. Only the fusion of the lightest elements is seriously considered as a future energy source.  Fusion of the lightest atom, 1H hydrogen, as is done in the Sun and stars, has also not been considered practical on Earth.  Although the energy density of fusion fuel is even higher than fission fuel, and fusion reactions sustained for a few minutes have been achieved, utilizing fusion fuel as a net energy source remains only a theoretical possibility.

First-generation fusion fuel
Deuterium and tritium are both considered first-generation fusion fuels; they are the easiest to fuse, because the electrical charge on their nuclei is the lowest of all elements. The three most commonly cited nuclear reactions that could be used to generate energy are:

2H + 3H → n (14.07 MeV) + 4He (3.52 MeV)

2H + 2H → n (2.45 MeV) + 3He (0.82 MeV)

2H + 2H → p (3.02 MeV) + 3H (1.01 MeV)

Second-generation fusion fuel
Second-generation fuels require either higher confinement temperatures or longer confinement time than those required of first-generation fusion fuels, but generate fewer neutrons. Neutrons are an unwanted byproduct of fusion reactions in an energy generation context, because they are absorbed by the walls of a fusion chamber, making them radioactive. They cannot be confined by magnetic fields, because they are not electrically charged. This group consists of deuterium and helium-3. The products are all charged particles, but there may be significant side reactions leading to the production of neutrons.
2H + 3He → p (14.68 MeV) + 4He (3.67 MeV)

Third-generation fusion fuel

Third-generation fusion fuels produce only charged particles in the primary reactions, and side reactions are relatively unimportant. Since a very small amount of neutrons is produced, there would be little induced radioactivity in the walls of the fusion chamber. This is often seen as the end goal of fusion research. 3He has the highest Maxwellian reactivity of any 3rd generation fusion fuel. However, there are no significant natural sources of this substance on Earth.
3He + 3He → 2 p + 4He (12.86 MeV)

Another potential aneutronic fusion reaction is the proton-boron reaction:
p + 11B → 3 4He (8.7 MeV)

Under reasonable assumptions, side reactions will result in about 0.1% of the fusion power being carried by neutrons. With 123 keV, the optimum temperature for this reaction is nearly ten times higher than that for the pure hydrogen reactions, the energy confinement must be 500 times better than that required for the D-T reaction, and the power density will be 2500 times lower than for D-T.

See also

Fissile material
Global Nuclear Energy Partnership
Integrated Nuclear Fuel Cycle Information System
Lists of nuclear disasters and radioactive incidents
Nuclear fuel bank
Nuclear fuel cycle
Reprocessed uranium
Uranium market

Notes

References

External links

PWR fuel

Picture showing handling of a PWR bundle

BWR fuel

Physical description of LWR fuel
Links to BWR photos from the nuclear tourist webpage

CANDU fuel
CANDU Fuel pictures and FAQ
Basics on CANDU design
The Evolution of CANDU Fuel Cycles and their Potential Contribution to World Peace

CANDU Fuel and Reactor Specifics (Nuclear Tourist)
Candu Fuel Rods and Bundles

TRISO fuel
TRISO fuel descripción
Non-Destructive Examination of SiC Nuclear Fuel Shell using X-Ray Fluorescence Microtomography Technique
GT-MHR fuel compact process
Description of TRISO fuel for "pebbles"
LANL webpage showing various stages of TRISO fuel production
Method to calculate the temperature profile in TRISO fuel

QUADRISO fuel
Conceptual Design of QUADRISO Fuel

CERMET fuel

Thoria-based Cermet Nuclear Fuel: Sintered Microsphere Fabrication by Spray Drying

Plate type fuel
List of reactors at INL and picture of ATR core
ATR plate fuel

TRIGA fuel

Fusion fuel
Advanced fusion fuels presentation

 
Nuclear reprocessing
Nuclear technology
Nuclear chemistry
Actinides